Juan Carlos Hase (24 April 1948 - 3 February 2022), was an Argentine chess International Master (1982), Argentine Chess Championship medalist (1982).

Biography
In the 1970s and 1980s Juan Carlos Hase was one of the leading Argentine chess players. He took part in Argentine Chess Championship finals many times and in 1982 shared 1st-5th place. After additional tournament he won silver medal behind winner Jorge Rubinetti.

Juan Carlos Hase played for Argentina in the Chess Olympiads:
 In 1972, at second reserve board in the 20th Chess Olympiad in Skopje (+6, =5, -4),
 In 1978, at third board in the 23rd Chess Olympiad in Buenos Aires (+4, =5, -1),
 In 1980, at second reserve board in the 24th Chess Olympiad in La Valletta (+4, =2, -0),
 In 1982, at third board in the 25th Chess Olympiad in Lucerne (+1, =2, -3).

In 1982, Juan Carlos Hase was awarded the FIDE International Master (IM) title.

References

External links

Juan Carlos Hase chess games at 365chess.com

1948 births
2022 deaths
Sportspeople from Buenos Aires
Chess International Masters
Argentine chess players
Chess Olympiad competitors